Bunker Hill Breweries was a brewery founded in 1821 by John Cooper and Thomas Gould in Charlestown, (Boston) Massachusetts, USA.

See also
 List of defunct consumer brands
 List of defunct breweries in the United States

References 

American companies established in 1821
Food and drink companies disestablished in 1918
Food and drink companies based in Boston
Manufacturing companies based in Boston
Beer brewing companies based in Massachusetts
Defunct consumer brands
American beer brands
Defunct brewery companies of the United States
Defunct manufacturing companies based in Massachusetts
Food and drink companies established in 1821
1821 establishments in Massachusetts
1918 disestablishments in Massachusetts